No Plan B is the 22nd and final album by contemporary Christian musician Carman. It was released on May 27, 2014, via Norway Avenue Records. This album was produced by Carman, Tre' Corely and Tedd T. The album peaked at No. 66 on the Billboard 200, and at No. 3 on the Top Christian Albums charts.

Critical reception 

No Plan B met with generally positive reception from music critics. At CCM Magazine, Andy Argyrakis rated the album four stars out of five, remarking how Carman "returns with a bang". Kelcey Wixtrom of CM Addict rated the album four stars out of five, indicating how "these upbeat, intensive combinations are a change worth exploring!" At 365 Days of Inspiring Media, Jonathan Andre rated the album four stars out of five, commenting that "Even if his new album doesn't chart well when stacked against today's popular artists, No Plan B still has something great about it" because it is one of his "most unique albums".

At Jesus Freak Hideout, Mark Rice rated the album two-and-a-half stars out of five, noting how "No Plan B is undoubtedly a charming and nostalgic record, but unfortunately, its charm and nostalgia is founded in a sound that is in the past for a reason." Matthew Morris of Jesus Freak Hideout rated the album three stars out of five, highlighting how the release is stereotypical Carman doing what he does best, yet says "Therein lies the problem with No Plan B." At Jesus Wired, Jessica Morris rated the album an eight out of ten stars, illustrating how on "No Plan B, Carman is still as bold and uncompromising as ever."

Commercial performance 
For the Billboard charting week of June 14, 2014, No Plan B was the No. 15 most sold album in the Top Christian Albums market. During its second week on the chart, the album was the No. 66 best selling album in the entirety of the United States via the Billboard 200, and it was the No. 3 best selling of Christian Albums. This occurred for the charting week of June 21, 2014.

Track listing

Charts

References 

2014 albums
Carman (singer) albums